The 2nd constituency of the Tarn-et-Garonne (French: Deuxième circonscription de Tarn-et-Garonne) is a French legislative constituency in Tarn-et-Garonne département. Like the other 576 French constituencies, it elects one MP using the two-round system, with a run-off if no candidate receives over 50% of the vote in the first round.

Description

The 2nd constituency of Tarn-et-Garonne is one of two in the department. This largely rural constituency covers its western half and includes the towns of Castelsarrasin and Moissac.

The seat has broadly followed national trends, however the small Radical Party of the Left has enjoyed a monopoly on the centre left candidature as part of an agreement with the much larger Socialist Party. At the 2017 election En Marche! failed to stand a candidate and the far right National Front secured a place in the final round at the expense of the mainstream conservative The Republicans who came third in the first round.

Assembly Members

Election results

2022

 
 
 
 
 
 
|-
| colspan="8" bgcolor="#E9E9E9"|
|-

2017

 
 
 
 
 
 
 
|-
| colspan="8" bgcolor="#E9E9E9"|
|-

2012

 
 
 
 
 
 
|-
| colspan="8" bgcolor="#E9E9E9"|
|-

2007

 
 
 
 
 
 
 
 
|-
| colspan="8" bgcolor="#E9E9E9"|
|-

2002

 
 
 
 
 
 
 
 
|-
| colspan="8" bgcolor="#E9E9E9"|
|-

1997

 
 
 
 
 
 
 
|-
| colspan="8" bgcolor="#E9E9E9"|
|-

References

2